Natalia Sánchez may refer to:

 Natalia Sánchez (actress) (born 1990), Spanish actress
 Natalia Sánchez (archer) (born 1983), Colombian archer
 Natalia Sánchez (rhythmic gymnast) (born 1988), Brazilian rhythmic gymnast

See also
 Nathalia Sánchez (born 1992), Colombian artistic gymnast